Jeff Brady is a national-desk reporter for National Public Radio. He is based in Philadelphia, Pennsylvania, and covers the energy industry and general issues in the Mid-Atlantic Region of the United States.

Before he was transferred to Philadelphia in July 2011, Brady was based in Denver, Colorado, and reported on issues and events in the Western United States. He also reported extensively on the aftermath of Hurricane Katrina.

Education
Brady graduated from Southern Oregon State College.

Career
Before he became a reporter, Brady ran a small country store in Oregon. In 1989 he began to perform volunteer work at the local NPR station, Jefferson Public Radio, work that eventually led to his being hired as an interim news director.

References

External links
NPR: Jeff Brady

Year of birth missing (living people)
Living people
Southern Oregon University alumni
American radio reporters and correspondents
American male journalists
NPR personalities